"Repressed" is a single by Apocalyptica, released on 19 May 2006. The title song features Max Cavalera (Soulfly and Sepultura) and Matt Tuck (Bullet for my Valentine) on vocals. It's mostly sung in English and Portuguese, which parts in the last one are done by Cavalera.

Track listing
 "Repressed" (Single version) featuring Max Cavalera & Matt Tuck 
 "Path Vol.2" featuring Sandra Nasic
 "Betrayal" (from Apocalyptica)
 "Repressed" (Video)

2006 singles
Apocalyptica songs
Macaronic songs
2006 songs
Songs written by Eicca Toppinen
Songs written by Max Cavalera
Universal Records singles
Songs written by Matthew Tuck